Bob Bromley (born 1952 or 1953) is an American politician. He is a member of the Missouri House of Representatives from the 162nd District, serving since 2019. He is a member of the Republican Party.

Missouri House of Representatives

Committee assignments 

 Utilities, Vice chairman
 Transportation
 Veterans
 Joint Committee on Transportation Oversight

References

Living people
1950s births
Republican Party members of the Missouri House of Representatives
21st-century American politicians